Andrena erythronii is a species of miner bee native to eastern North America. It is known as the trout lily miner bee, trout-lily andrena, and trout lily bee, for its association with trout lilies, flowers in the genus Erythronium. It has also been observed visiting the flowers of other spring ephemerals such as spring beauty (Claytonia), hepatica (Hepatica), and harbinger-of-spring (Erigenia bulbosa), as well as spring-flowering shrubs and trees: serviceberry (Amelanchier), plum and cherry (Prunus), and willow (Salix).

Female trout lily miner bees reach 11–14 mm in length while males are a little smaller: 9–11 mm.

References

erythronii
Insects described in 1891
Articles created by Qbugbot